Bastamlu Rural District is in the Central District of Khoda Afarin County, East Azerbaijan province, Iran. At the National Census of 2006, its population was 5,907 in 1,168 households, when it was in the former Khoda Afarin District of Kaleybar County. There were 5,407 inhabitants in 1,329 households at the following census of 2011, by which time Khoda Afarin District had been raised to the status of a county. At the most recent census of 2016, the population of the rural district was 4,561 in 1,359 households. The largest of its 27 villages was Aliverdi Owshaqi, with 675 people.

References 

Khoda Afarin County

Rural Districts of East Azerbaijan Province

Populated places in East Azerbaijan Province

Populated places in Khoda Afarin County